Age of Reason is the thirteenth studio album by Australian pop singer John Farnham. It was released through BMG in Australia on 25 July 1988 and debuted at No. 1 on the Australian Recording Industry Association (ARIA) Albums Chart in August and remained on top for eight weeks. It was the follow-up to his previous No. 1 album, Whispering Jack, and was the highest-selling album in Australia in 1988. As of 1997, it was eight times platinum, indicating sales of over 560,000 units. It is also critically considered one of Farnham's best albums, with the title track "Age of Reason" and "Beyond the Call" being about the urgency for the world to wake up and solve its problems.

The first two singles from the album were "Age of Reason", which peaked at No. 1, and "Two Strong Hearts", at No. 6. Two further singles were released: "Beyond the Call", which reached the top 50, and "We're No Angels".

The album was re-released on vinyl on 18 August 2017 by Sony Music.

Background
Farnham released Whispering Jack in October 1986, becoming the highest-selling album by an Australian act in Australia and peaked at No. 1 on the Australian Kent Music Report Album Charts for a, then record, total of 25 weeks. Ahead of his follow-up album, in July 1988, he released the title single, "Age of Reason", which peaked at No. 1 on the ARIA Singles Chart, It was written by Johanna Pigott and Dragon member Todd Hunter. The album, Age of Reason, which was produced by Ross Fraser, debuted at No. 1 on the ARIA Albums Chart in August and stayed on top for eight weeks. It was the highest-selling album in Australia from 1988, and, as of 1997, it was 8 × platinum indicating sales of over 560,000 units. Renewed interest in Whispering Jack returned that album to the Top Ten in August, nearly two years after its initial release.  
 
As of December 2008, "Age of Reason" remains Farnham's last No. 1 Australian single. Other charting singles from this album were "Two Strong Hearts", which peaked at No. 6, and "Beyond the Call", while a fourth single, "We're No Angels", did not reach the top 50. Age of Reason had international success, peaking at No. 4 in Sweden and No. 9 in Norway.
The album features, apart from Farnham's regular band, many special guest artists including singer Jon Stevens on the track "Listen to the Wind" and trumpeter James Morrison on "Some Do, Some Don't".

ARIA awards
At the 1988 ARIA Awards, Farnham won 'Best Male Artist', 'Best Adult Contemporary Album' for "Touch of Paradise", and the 'Outstanding Achievement Award'. In March 1989, Farnham was in Moscow, USSR to promote Greenpeace album Rainbow Warriors, as part of an international ensemble including David Byrne (Talking Heads), Peter Gabriel, Chrissie Hynde (The Pretenders), Annie Lennox (Eurythmics) and The Edge (U2). Farnham found time to record "Communication", a duet with Dannielle Gaha, as part of the National Drug Offensive's anti-drug campaign. The song peaked at No. 13 in August 1989.

Bonus tracks
The CD version of Age of Reason has two bonus tracks including Farnham's covers of AC/DC's "It's a Long Way to the Top (If You Wanna Rock 'n' Roll)" and Cold Chisel's "When the War Is Over".

Popular culture 
The lead single off the album, "Age of Reason", was used in a promo for Australia's Channel Seven News in 2000.

Track listing
 "Age of Reason" (Todd Hunter, Johanna Pigott) – 5:08
 "Blow by Blow" (Dave Stewart, Olle Ormo, Brian Harrison) – 4:37
 "Listen to the Wind" (Brent Thomas, Jon Stevens) – 4:26
 "Two Strong Hearts" (Bruce Woolley, Andy Hill) – 3:35
 "Burn Down the Night" (Bill LaBounty) – 3:32
 "Beyond the Call" (David Batteau, Darrell Brown, Kevin Dukes) – 4:43
 "We're No Angels" (Ross Wilson) – 4:52
 "Don't Tell Me It Can't Be Done" (Chris Thompson, Andy Qunta) – 3:35
 "The Fire" (Thompson, Keith Reid, Jed Leiber) – 4:26
 "Some Do, Some Don't" (Stephen Hague, Mark Mueller) – 4:19
CD bonus tracks:
 "When the War Is Over" (Steve Prestwich) – 4:50
 "It's a Long Way to the Top (If You Wanna Rock 'n' Roll)" (Angus Young, Malcolm Young, Bon Scott) –  4:11

Personnel
John Farnham – vocals
David Hirschfelder – keyboards
Brett Garsed – guitars
Angus Burchall – drums & percussion
Wayne Nelson – bass
Venetta Fields – vocals
Lindsay Field – vocals
Jon Stevens – guitar on "Listen to the Wind"
James Morrison – trumpet on "Some Do, Some Don't"
Bill Harrower – sax on "Blow by Blow"
Thomas Metropouli – mandolin & piano accordion
Lisa Edwards – additional vocals
Ross Hannaford – additional vocals
Joe Creighton – additional vocals

Charts

Weekly charts

Year-end charts

Certifications

See also
 List of number-one albums of 1988 (Australia)

References

General
  Note: Archived [on-line] copy has limited functionality.
Specific
 

1988 albums
John Farnham albums